Sagag is one of the woredas in the Somali Region of Ethiopia, named after its major town, Sagag. Part of the Nogob Zone, Sagag is bordered on the south by Dihun, on the west by Hamero, on the north by Yahob, on the northeast by the Jarar Zone, and on the southeast by Gerbo.

Demographics 
Based on the 2007 Census conducted by the Central Statistical Agency of Ethiopia (CSA), this woreda has a total population of 23,986, of whom 13,145 are men and 10,841 women. While 4,477 or 18.67% are urban inhabitants, a further 14,997 or 62.52% are pastoralists. 98.71% of the population said they were Muslim.
This woreda is primarily inhabited by the Ogaden Mohamed zuber, Ugaas Samatar ( Maalinguur) clan of the Somali people.

The 1997 national census reported a total population for this woreda of 21,355, of whom 11,809 were men and 9,546 were women; 2,488 or 11.65% of its population were urban dwellers. (This total also includes an estimate for the inhabitants of 22 rural kebeles, which were not counted; they were estimated to have 3,806 inhabitants, of whom 2,107 were men and 1,699 women.) The largest ethnic group reported in Segeg was the Somali (99.98%).

Notes 

Districts of Somali Region